Cordia obliqua, the clammy cherry, is a flowering plant species in the genus Cordia.

The larvae of Brenthia coronigera, a species of moth found in Bengal, India, feeds on Cordia obliqua.

Hesperetin 7-rhamnoside, a glycoside of hesperetin, can be isolated from the plant.

References

External links 

obliqua
Plants described in 1798